Merwin John William Jacobson (March 7, 1894 – January 13, 1978) was a backup outfielder in Major League Baseball who played for three different teams between  and . He was born in New Britain, Connecticut. 
 
A decent outfielder with a hard throwing arm, Jacobson entered the majors in 1915 with the New York Giants, playing for them one year before joining the Chicago Cubs in 1916.  From 1917 to 1925 he played with the Baltimore Orioles and Jersey City Skeeters of the International League.  During the 1920 season, Jacobsen led the International League with a batting average of .404, 235 hits and 161 runs scored.  He returned to the major leagues with the Brooklyn Robins in 1926 and 1927. His most productive season came in 1926 with Brooklyn, when he posted a .247 batting average with 23 RBI in a career-high 110 games.

In a four-season career, Jacobson hit .230 (76-for-331) with 47 runs and 24 RBI in 133 games, including nine doubles, two triples, seven stolen bases, and a .309 on-base percentage. He made 99 outfield appearances at center field (55), right (42) and left (2), and posted a collective .973 fielding percentage.

After his time with the Robins he never appeared again in the major leagues, but he continued to play minor league baseball until 1933.  
 
Jacobson died in Baltimore, Maryland at age 83.

Transactions
During the 1916 season was sent by the Giants with Larry Doyle and Herb Hunter to the Cubs in exchange for Heinie Zimmerman and Mickey Doolan.

Further reading
Johnson, Lloyd and Wolff, Miles, editors: Encyclopedia of Minor League Baseball. Durham, North Carolina Publisher: Baseball America, 2007. Format: Hardback, 767 pp.

External links

Retrosheet

1894 births
1978 deaths
Brooklyn Robins players
Chicago Cubs players
New York Giants (NL) players
Major League Baseball outfielders
Baseball players from Connecticut
Calais-St. Stephen (minor league baseball) players
Portland Duffs players
Lynn Shoemakers players
Brockton Shoemakers players
Brockton Pilgrims players
Rochester Hustlers players
Toronto Maple Leafs (International League) players
Baltimore Orioles (IL) players
Jersey City Skeeters players
Newark Bears (IL) players
Hagerstown Hubs players
St. Paul Saints (AA) players
Springfield Ponies players
York White Roses players
Norfolk Tars players
Sportspeople from New Britain, Connecticut
St. Croix Downeasters players